Elk Township is the name of some places in the U.S. state of Michigan:

 Elk Township, Lake County, Michigan
 Elk Township, Sanilac County, Michigan

See also 
 Elk Rapids Township, Michigan in Antrim County
 Elkland Township, Michigan in Tuscola County
 Elk Township (disambiguation)

Michigan township disambiguation pages